This is a list of notable people associated with Lady Margaret Hall, Oxford, including members (alumni) and academics.

Notable members 

Alumni of the college (who are termed Senior Members) include:

 James Allen, Formula One commentator
 Diana Athill, publisher's editor
 Gertrude Bell, writer and diplomat
 Nora Beloff, journalist and political writer
 Benazir Bhutto, former prime minister of Pakistan
 Elisabeth Blochmann, educationalist
 Katharine Mary Briggs, writer
 Guy Browning, author and humorist
 Caryl Churchill, playwright
 Danny Cohen, former Controller of BBC One
 Charles C. W. Cooke, journalist and broadcaster
 Donal Coonan, presenter
 Lindsey Davis, novelist
 Vivien Duffield, philanthropist
 Katharine Esdaile (1881–1950), art historian 
 Neil Ferguson, epidemiologist
 Amanda Foreman, historian
 Antonia Fraser, writer
 Michael Gove, politician
 Eric Greitens, 56th Governor of Missouri, author, former Rhodes Scholar and Navy SEAL, founder of The Mission Continues
 Alethea Hayter, author
 Stephen Hester, former CEO of RBS
 Tim Hetherington, photojournalist
 Baroness Hogg, journalist
 George Hollingbery, politician
 Philip Hollobone, politician
 Richard Howitt, politician
 Eglantyne Jebb, founder of Save the Children
 Charlotte Johnson Wahl, artist
 Matthew Jones, actor and musical comedian
 Lucy Kellaway, journalist
 Bridget Kendall, BBC diplomatic correspondent
 Joanna Kennedy, civil engineer
 Francis Lannon, historian and former Principal of Lady Margaret Hall
 Nigella Lawson, journalist and celebrity television cooking show presenter

 Ann Leslie, journalist
 Goodwin Liu, Associate Justice of the Supreme Court of California, former Rhodes Scholar
 Josie Long, comedian
 Elizabeth Longford, writer
 Elinor Lyon, children's writer
 Eliza Manningham-Buller, former director general of MI5
 Sujata Manohar, former Judge of the Supreme Court of India
 Simon Mason, author of juvenile and adult fiction
 Lucasta Miller, writer and critic
 Barbara Mills, former Director of Public Prosecutions
 Priscilla Napier, author
 Pauline Neville-Jones, former Minister of State for Security and Counter Terrorism
 Cathy Newman, Channel 4 News presenter and journalist
 Michelle Paver, author
 H. F. M. Prescott, historian
 Diana Quick, actress
 Dominic Raab, politician
 Margaret Rawlings, actress
 Johnny Rogan, author and broadcaster
 Victoria Schofield, author
 Frances Stead Sellers, senior writer for the Washington Post
 Conrad Shawcross, artist
 Marie Slocombe, founder of the BBC Sound Archive
 Jeany Spark, actress
 Matthew Taylor, politician
 Ann Trindade, historian
 Anna Walker, British civil servant
 Marina Warner, writer
 Baroness Warnock, philosopher
 C. V. Wedgwood, historian
 Samuel West, actor
 Helen Whately, politician
 Ann Widdecombe, politician
 Malala Yousafzai, youngest-ever Nobel Prize laureate, female education activist

Notable fellows and academics 

Notable fellows of the college include:
 Helen Barr
 Edith Bülbring, scientist in smooth muscle physiology, FRS
 Professor Andrew Burrows, Justice of the UK Supreme Court
 Barbara Hammond
 Dame Francis Lannon
 Baroness Manningham-Buller
 David MacDonald
 Ewan McKendrick
 Claudio Sillero-Zubiri
 Robert Stevens
 Guy Stroumsa
 Rhoda Sutherland

Visiting fellows 

The college has a number of Visiting Fellows. Holders of this non-salaried role are drawn from a variety of backgrounds, callings and professions.
These fellowships are for three years and have included:
Lady Hale
Emma Watson
 Benedict Cumberbatch
Gary Lineker
 Malorie Blackman
 Cornelia Parker
 Francis Habgood
 Sir Rabinder Singh QC
 Mark Simpson 
 Jennifer Rohn
David Olusoga
 Henry Marsh
 Neil Tennant
 Beeban Kidron
Kwame Kwei-Armah

The fellowships are intended to form a bridge between the academic community and the worlds they inhabit.

Principals

References 

Lists of people associated with the University of Oxford
People associated with Lady Margaret Hall, Oxford